The National Federation of Mines and Energy (FNME) is a trade union representing workers in the energy and mining industries, in France.

The union was founded in 1999, when the National Federation of Miners merged with the National Federation of Energy.  Like its predecessors, it is affiliated to the General Confederation of Labour (CGT).  On formation, the union had 91,000 members, making it the largest CGT member, but this figure has fallen, as employment in the sectors has dropped.  The union has three sections: gas and electric, mines, and atomic energy.

General Secretaries
1999: Denis Cohen
2003: Frédéric Imbrecht
2010: Virginie Gensel

External links

References

Energy industry trade unions
Mining trade unions
Trade unions in France
Trade unions established in 1999
1999 establishments in France